Motta Visconti is a comune (municipality) in the Metropolitan City of Milan in the Italian region Lombardy, located about  southwest of Milan.

Motta Visconti borders the following municipalities: Vigevano, Casorate Primo, Besate, Trovo, Bereguardo.

People
Sante Geronimo Caserio (1873–1894), anarchist

References

External links
 Official website

Cities and towns in Lombardy